Granada Street, also known as Senator Jose O. Vera Street, is a road in Quezon City, Metro Manila, the Philippines. It runs from Nicanor Domingo Street as an extension of Gilmore Avenue to the boundary with San Juan, where it terminates at Bonny Serrano Avenue and becomes Ortigas Avenue.

Route description 
The land on which the street lies on used to be part of an estate owned by the family of José O. Vera, founder of Sampaguita Pictures and later Senator from 1946 to 1949. In the late 1950s, Quezon City mayor Norberto S. Amoranto convinced the Vera family to permit construction of the street through their property, part of a project to improve connectivity between Quezon City — at the time the capital of the Philippines — and the surrounding suburbs, particularly those headed to New Manila from Mandaluyong and Pasig. The family sold  of land to the Quezon City government at a significant discount to facilitate construction of the road, and its completion enabled direct access to Quezon City from eastern Metro Manila without needing to go through side streets or Epifanio de los Santos Avenue. In 2004, the street was renamed after Vera by the Sangguniang Panlungsod of Quezon City.

Today, Granada Street is known for being home to several parol (Christmas lantern) vendors which line both sides of the street, giving it the name "Parol Row". Also known as the Parolan sa San Juan ("Lantern Area on the San Juan"), selling lanterns here began in the 1990s, when Sampaguita Pictures crewmen made lanterns and sold them outside the studio premises to generate extra income. Several vendors sell their lanterns here from September to December every year, with some selling the rest of the year as well. The street is also a culinary destination, having held this distinction since the 1970s. Modern-day dining establishments along the street include Gavino's Donuts, known for their Japanese-style donuts, and Mien-San, known for their Chinese-style steamed brisket and other dishes.

References 

Streets in Quezon City